

Description

Stratigraphy

The West Falls Group is a geologic group in New York. It preserves fossils dating back to the Devonian period.

The West Falls formation is bounded above by the Java Formation and below by the Sonyea Formation. It comprises the Angola Shale and Rhinestreet Shale Members. It was deposited during the Acadian Orogeny and is part of the Salina thrust sheet.

Geographic distribution

The Rhinestreet Shale and Angola Shale Members of the West Falls Formation are both recognized in the subsurface from western New York to eastern Tennessee.

Lithology
The predominant lithology of the West Falls Group is shale. The Rhinestreet Member can be further subdivided into two shale types: a thick, fissile black shale underlies a gray to greenish-gray shale that likely indicates a transitional environment. The Angola member is a gray to greenish-gray shale, easily distinguished by its consistent low gamma ray signature, which is typical of this shale type.

Paleontology
The West Falls Formation was deposited during the Frasnian stage of the Upper Devonian. Two distinct community types are observed in the group: "a shallower water spiriferacean-rhynchonellide-bivalve species ensemble, and a deeper water assemblage of unattached epibenthic and sessile semi-infaunal brachiopods" (Sutton, McGee).

Economic significance
Both members of the West Falls Formation have been assessed for oil and gas exploration. The USGS has determined that the average total organic carbon (TOC) in the Rhinestreet Shale is 0.89%; the TOC in the Angola Shale is 1.47%.

The Rathbone shale field in Rathbone, Steuben County, New York was discovered in 1931. 31 wells were drilled in this field, targeting the Angola and Rhinestreet members. Of these, 24 produced natural gas, 4 were dry holes, 2 were plugged and abandoned, and one produced oil.

See also

 List of fossiliferous stratigraphic units in New York

References

 
 
 http://pubs.usgs.gov/imap/i2791/FIG3.pdf
 https://mrdata.usgs.gov/geology/state/sgmc-unit.php?unit=NYDwf%3B4
 http://www.dnr.state.oh.us/Portals/10/pdf/OpenFileReports/OFR_88-3.pdf
 http://treichlerlawoffice.com/radiation/HillNY.pdf

Geologic groups of New York (state)